Addi Tapaa (2004) is a Punjabi film, directed by Jeet Matharu.

References

2004 films
Punjabi-language Indian films